Araneus angulatus is a species of orb-weaving spiders found in the Palearctic realm. It resembles the European garden spider, Araneus diadematus, but has distinctive tubercles on its abdomen. The species was first described in Aranei Svecici in 1757, where it was the first species described, making Araneus angulatus the first scientific name of an animal that is still in use.

Description
Araneus angulatus closely resembles the more frequently encountered European garden spider, Araneus diadematus, but can be distinguished by the presence of angular tubercles on the abdomen.

Distribution
Araneus angulatus is found across a wide geographical range in the Palearctic realm. It is widespread in Europe, although rarer in Northern Europe. A. angulatus is rare in the United Kingdom, where it is restricted to areas near the South coast of England.

Subspecies 
Six subspecies are currently recognized:
 Araneus angulatus afolius (Franganillo, 1909) — Portugal
 Araneus angulatus atricolor Simon, 1929 — France
 Araneus angulatus levifolius (Franganillo, 1909) — Portugal
 Araneus angulatus niger (Franganillo, 1918) — Spain
 Araneus angulatus nitidifolius (Franganillo, 1909) — Portugal
 Araneus angulatus personatus Simon, 1929

Much of the previous subspecies are now part of Araneus pallidus.

Ecology
A. angulatus constructs a large orb web, suspended from bushes and trees, often with support lines leading to the ground. Unlike A. diadematus, the web of A. angulatus has no retreat, so the spider must sit in the centre of the web while it waits for prey. It detects prey items by vibrations they cause in the web, but has also been observed during a country fair, and reported to be "indifferent to crowds, music and fireworks".

Taxonomic history

Araneus angulatus was the first of the 66 species described in Carl Alexander Clerck's 1757 work  / . Under the International Code of Zoological Nomenclature  has precedence over the 10th edition of Carl Linnaeus' Systema Naturae from 1758, and is therefore the first work to contain scientific names of animals that are still in use.

References

Araneus
Spiders of Europe
Spiders described in 1757
Palearctic spiders
Taxa named by Carl Alexander Clerck